Irina Grjebine (1907–1994) was a Russian ballet dancer who worked at the Opéra Russe de Paris and who later established a school of choreography and her own Russian Ballet company.

She was the daughter of Zinovii Grzhebin,a Russian publisher based in St Petersburg. With her sister Lya, she was trained in ballet by Ivan Koussov, Nicolas Legat and Olga Preobrajenska.

References

1907 births
1994 deaths
Russian ballet dancers
Dancers from Saint Petersburg